Muschampia leuzeae, the Algerian grizzled skipper, is a butterfly of the  family Hesperiidae. It is endemic to Algeria.

The length of the forewings is about 15 mm. Adults are on wing from May to July in two generations.

The larvae feed on Phlomis species.

External links
All butterflies of Europe

Muschampia
Endemic fauna of Algeria
Butterflies of Africa
Butterflies described in 1881
Taxa named by Charles Oberthür